Clarkson was a British chat show, presented by Jeremy Clarkson, airing from 8 November 1998 to 27 December 2000 on BBC Two. The show featured guest interviews with musicians, politicians and television personalities.

Transmissions

Series

Specials

References

External links
 
 

1998 British television series debuts
2000 British television series endings
1990s British comedy television series
2000s British comedy television series
BBC Television shows
BBC television talk shows
English-language television shows